The Lancair ES is an American amateur-built aircraft that was designed and produced by Lancair. While it was in production the aircraft was supplied as a kit for amateur construction.

Production of the aircraft kit was ended in 2012.

Design and development

The aircraft is made from composites. Its  span wing employs a McWilliams RXM5-217 airfoil at the wing root, transitioning to a NACA 64-212 at the wingtip. Construction time from the supplied kit is estimated to be 2000 hours.

When equipped with the  Continental IO-550-N the design was referred to as the Lancair Super ES. This was same powerplant used in the Columbia 300 and 350.

In July 2016 the company announced it would be selling the older Lancair lines of aircraft to concentrate on the Lancair Evolution instead. Once the transition is complete the company will change its name to the Evolution Aircraft Company.

Operational history
By December 2011, 90 examples had been completed and flown. At least two examples have utilized custom engine mounts to allow installation of Lycoming IO-540 engines.

Specifications (Super ES)

References

United States sport aircraft
ES
Homebuilt aircraft
Single-engined tractor aircraft
Low-wing aircraft